Miroslav Koev (born 22 April 1990) is a Bulgarian footballer who plays as a defender for Chernomorets Burgas.

References

 
 Player Profile at Football24
 Player Profile at Sportal.bg

1990 births
Living people
Bulgarian footballers
FC Pomorie players
FC Lokomotiv 1929 Sofia players
PFC Kaliakra Kavarna players
FC Sozopol players
Neftochimic Burgas players
First Professional Football League (Bulgaria) players
Association football defenders